The MV Patrick Morris was a Canadian National Railway (CN) train ferry that sank on her run from North Sydney, Nova Scotia to Port aux Basques, Newfoundland during a storm in the early morning hours of 20 April 1970 while responding to a mayday call from the Newfoundland-based herring seiner FV Enterprise.  The ship's Captain Roland Penney was given permission to leave North Sydney ahead of schedule to assist the wood-hulled fishing vessel in distress. No passengers were aboard the Patrick Morris when she set sail shortly before midnight for the rescue mission on 19 April.

Construction
Built for the West India Fruit and Steamship Company by Canadian Vickers Ltd. of Montreal, Quebec in 1951, the 460-foot vessel  was called the SS New Grand Haven and operated as a railcar ferry between Palm Beach, Florida and Havana, Cuba until 1959 when Fidel Castro came to power in Cuba and business declined due to the United States Trade Embargo. 
In 1961, the company sold all six of its ferries.

The Government of Canada bought the SS New Grand Haven, converted her to diesel, and renamed her the MV Patrick Morris to honour Irishman Patrick Morris, a Newfoundland colonial politician.  The ship was affectionately known by the nickname Paddy Morris; she became CN's first train ferry to serve the North Sydney - Port aux Basques route.

Loss
Patrick Morris left North Sydney, NS shortly before midnight on 19 April before her regularly scheduled departure time and headed to the last reported position of Enterprise. Around daybreak, her crew spotted a body in the water that was presumed to be that of a crew member from the fishing vessel. In the process of maneuvering to recover the body, Patrick Morris  was overwhelmed when struck by a  wave that smashed through rail car loading doors at the stern and she began taking on water. Patrick Morris sent out her own mayday call at 6:51 am and sank 35 minutes later. Of her crew of 51 officers and sailors, 47 survived. Captain Penney, Chief Engineer David Reekie, Second Engineer Joseph Henry Slayman and Third Engineer Ronald A. Anderson were lost. All eight crewmen perished from Enterprise.

References

http://www.wrecksite.eu/wreck.aspx?35988
https://news.google.com/newspapers?id=k5MjAAAAIBAJ&sjid=FbkFAAAAIBAJ&pg=1751,1819440&dq=patrick+morris+sinking&hl=en
http://nswrecks.net/ns-datapages/patrickmorris-dat.htm
http://www.capebretonpost.com/Opinion/Columns/2008-03-03/article-781650/Search-for-sunken-railcar-ferry-Patrick-Morris-will-begin-in-April/1
http://images.maritimehistoryofthegreatlakes.ca/63115/page/26
http://www.capebretonpost.com/Living/2010-04-20/article-1031331/Survivors-mark-40th-anniversary-of-sinking-of-the-Patrick-Morris-/1 40th anniversary remembrance
http://www.capebretonpost.com/Opinion/Columnists/2009-07-13/article-783994/The-Patrick-Morris-sank-while-taking-part-in-a-dangerous-rescue-mission

External links
 http://nswrecks.net/ns-datapages/patrickmorris-dat.htm
 http://capebretonsmagazine.com/modules/publisher/item.php?itemid=5467|The Sinking of the Patrick Morris- One Sailor's day

Shipwrecks of the Nova Scotia coast
Ferries of Nova Scotia
Ferries of Newfoundland and Labrador
Canadian National Railway
1951 ships
Ships built in Quebec
Maritime incidents in 1970